This article shows all participating team squads at the 2021 Women's European Volleyball Championship, held in Serbia, Bulgaria, Croatia and Romania from 18 August to 4 September 2021.

Pool A

Azerbaijan

The following is the Azerbaijani roster in the 2021 European Championship.

Head coach:Vugar Aliyev

2 Yana Doroshenko 
4 Ilhama Aliyeva 
6 Ayshan Abdulazimova 
7 Olena Kharchenko 
10 Anastasiya Mertsalova 
11 Anastasiia Baidiuk 
14 Kristina Besman 
15 Nilufar Aghazada 
16 Yuliya Karimova 
18 Shafagat Alishanova 
19 Bayaz Aliyeva 
20 Margarita Stepanenko 
21 Kseniya Pavlenko 
22 Mariya Kirilyuk

Belgium

The following is the Belgium roster in the 2021 European Championship.

Head coach: Gert Vande Broek

2 Elise Van Sas 
3 Britt Herbots 
4 Nathalie Lemmens 
5 Jodie Guilliams 
6 Helena Gilson 
7 Celine Van Gestel 
9 Nel Demeyer 
10 Dominika Sobolska 
13 Marlies Janssens 
15 Jutta Van De Vyver 
17 Ilka Van de Vyver 
18 Britt Rampelberg 
19 Silke Van Avermaet 
21 Manon Stragier

Bosnia and Herzegovina

The following is the Bosnia and Herzegovinan roster in the 2021 European Championship.

Head coach: Stevan Ljubičić

1 Ajla Paradžik 
2 Žana Dragutinović 
3 Milana Božić 
4 Ajla Hadžić 
5 Tamara Đapa 
6 Ivana Radović 
7 Anđelka Radišković 
9 Edina Begić 
10 Ela Klopić 
11 Edina Selimović 
12 Milica Ivković 
15 Dženita Rašidović 
16 Elena Babić 
17 Dajana Bošković

France

The following is the French roster in the 2021 European Championship.

Head coach: Emile Rousseaux

1 Héléna Cazaute 
3 Amandine Giardino 
9 Nina Stojiljkovic 
11 Lucille Gicquel 
12 Isaline Sager-Weider 
15 Amandha Marine Sylves 
21 Eva Elouga 
34 Lisa Arbos 
38 Leïa Ratahiry 
63 Émilie Respaut 
81 Jade Defraeye 
88 Amélie Rotar 
91 Halimatou Bah 
99 Juliette Gelin

Russia 

The following is the Russian roster in the 2021 European Championship. The Russian roster was revamped following the 2020 Summer Olympics to rest key players on the Olympic team.

Head coach: Sergio Busato

1 Elizaveta Kotova 
4 Daria Pilipenko 
5 Polina Matveeva 
10 Arina Fedorovtseva 
11 Yulia Brovkina 
12 Anna Lazareva 
13 Yevgeniya Startseva 
17 Tatiana Kadochkina 
22 Tamara Zaytseva 
23 Irina Kapustina 
25 Ksenia Smirnova 
26 Ekaterina Enina

Serbia

The following is the Serbian roster in the 2021 European Championship.

Head coach: Zoran Terzić

1 Bianka Buša 
2 Katarina Lazović 
3 Sara Carić 
5 Mina Popović 
8 Slađana Mirković 
10 Maja Ognjenović 
11 Stefana Veljković 
13 Ana Bjelica 
16 Milena Rašić 
17 Silvija Popović 
18 Tijana Bošković 
19 Bojana Milenković 
20 Jelena Blagojević 
21 Jovana Kocić

Pool B

Bulgaria

The following is the Bulgarian roster in the 2021 European Championship.

Head coach: Ivan Petkov

1 Gergana Dimitrova 
2 Nasya Dimitrova 
4 Eva Yaneva 
6 Miroslava Paskova 
7 Lora Kitipova 
8 Petya Barakova 
9 Borislava Saykova 
10 Mira Todorova 
11 Hristina Vuchkova 
14 Emiliya Dimitrova 
15 Zhana Todorova 
16 Elitsa Vasileva 
18 Galina Karabasheva 
19 Aleksandra Milanova

Czech Republic

The following is the Czech roster in the 2021 European Championship.

Head coach: Ioannis Athanasopoulos

1 Andrea Kossanyiová 
2 Eva Hodanová 
3 Veronika Trnková 
4 Gabriela Orvošová 
5 Eva Svobodová 
8 Barbora Purchartová 
10 Kateřina Valková 
11 Veronika Dostálová 
12 Michaela Mlejnková 
14 Adéla Chevalierová 
15 Magdaléna Jehlářová 
18 Pavlína Šimáňová 
19 Petra Kojdová 
23 Simona Bajusz

Germany

The following is the German roster in the 2021 European Championship.

Head coach: Felix Koslowski

1 Linda Bock 
2 Pia Kästner 
4 Denise Imoudu 
6 Jennifer Janiska 
8 Kimberly Drewniok 
9 Lina Alsmeier 
10 Lena Stigrot 
11 Louisa Lippmann 
12 Hanna Orthmann 
14 Marie Schölzel 
16 Lea Ambrosius 
17 Anna Pogany 
21 Camilla Weitzel 
22 Monique Strubbe

Greece

The following is the Greek roster in the 2021 European Championship.

Head coach: Guillermo Naranjo Hernandez

1 Aikaterina Giota 
2 Maria-Eleni Artakianou 
3 Sofia Kosma 
4 Olga Vergidou 
6 Martha Evdokia Anthouli 
7 Georgia Lamprousi 
8 Panagiota Rogka 
9 Olga Strantzali 
10 Ioanna-Lamprini Polynopoulou 
11 Anthí Vasilantonáki 
12 Evangelia Chantava 
14 Styliani Christodoulou 
20 Konstantina Vlachaki 
22 Angeliki-Melina Emmanouilidou

Poland

The following is the Polish roster in the 2021 European Championship.

Head coach: Jacek Nawrocki

1 Julia Nowicka 
2 Martyna Grajber 
3 Klaudia Alagierska 
8 Maria Stenzel 
9 Magdalena Stysiak 
10 Zuzanna Efimienko-Młotkowska 
11 Martyna Łukasik 
13 Monika Jagła 
16 Marta Ziółkowska 
17 Malwina Smarzek 
19 Monika Fedusio 
20 Martyna Czyrniańska 
26 Katarzyna Wenerska 
88 Zuzanna Górecka

Spain

The following is the Spanish roster in the 2021 European Championship.

Head coach: Pascual Saurin

4 Lucia Prol 
5 Alba Sanchez 
6 Lucrecia Castellano 
7 Carmen Unzue 
9 Elia Rodriguez Villanueva 
10 Inmaculada Lavado Fernandez 
11 Carolina Camino Fernandez 
12 Lucia Varela Gomez 
13 Patricia Llabrés 
16 Maria Segura Palleres 
17 Ana Escamilla 
20 Raquel Montoro 
23 Denia Bravo Culebra 
24 María Alejandra Alvarez

Pool C

Belarus

The following is the Belarusian roster in the 2021 European Championship.

Head coach: Stanislav Salikov

1 Viktoryia Panasenka 
3 Nadzeya Stoliar 
4 Anastasiya Kananovich 
6 Anastasiya Harelik 
7 Alena Fedarynchyk 
8 Katsiaryna Sakolchyk 
9 Nadzeya Vladyka 
11 Hanna Klimets 
15 Tatsiana Markevich 
16 Vera Kastsiuchyk 
17 Anastasiya Lapato 
18 Hanna Davyskiba 
20 Darya Valadzko 
21 Alena Laziuk

Croatia

The following is the Croatian roster in the 2021 European Championship.

Head coach: Daniele Santarelli

1 Rene Sain 
3 Ema Strunjak 
4 Božana Butigan 
5 Nikolina Božičević 
6 Klara Perić 
9 Lucija Mlinar 
10 Matea Ikić 
12 Beta Dumančić 
13 Samanta Fabris 
14 Martina Šamadan 
16 Laura Miloš 
17 Lea Deak 
18 Karla Klarić 
20 Dinka Kulić

Hungary

The following is the Hungarian roster in the 2021 European Championship.

Head coach: Jakub Głuszak

1 Gréta Szakmáry 
2 Fruzsina Tóth 
3 Adrienn Vezsenyi 
4 Fanni Bagyinka 
7 Kata Török 
8 Zsuzsanna Király-Tálas 
9 Dalma Juhár 
10 Kinga Szűcs 
11 Orsolya Papp 
13 Anett Németh 
14 Zsófia Gyimes 
16 Ágnes Pallag 
18 Eszter Anna Pekárik 
19 Gréta Kiss

Italy

The following is the Italian roster in the 2021 European Championship.

Head coach: Davide Mazzanti

3 Alessia Gennari 
4 Sara Bonifacio 
5 Ofelia Malinov 
6 Monica De Gennaro 
8 Alessia Orro 
10 Cristina Chirichella 
11 Anna Danesi 
13 Sarah Fahr 
14 Elena Pietrini 
15 Sylvia Nwakalor 
17 Miriam Sylla 
18 Paola Egonu 
20 Beatrice Parrocchiale 
24 Alessia Mazzaro 
29 Sofia D'Odorico

Slovakia

The following is the Slovakian roster in the 2021 European Championship.

Head coach: Marco Fenoglio

1 Michaela Abrhámová 
2 Barbora Koseková  
6 Karin Palgutová 
7 Michaela Španková 
9 Jaroslava Pencová 
10 Ema Smiešková 
11 Skarleta Jančová 
12 Nikola Radosová 
13 Romana Krišková 
14 Tereza Hrušecká 
15 Karolína Fričová 
16 Anna Kohútová 
18 Karin Šunderlíková 
22 Maria Žernovič

Switzerland

The following is the Swiss roster in the 2021 European Championship.

Head coach: Saskia van Hintum

2 Korina Perkovac 
3 Nicole Eiholzer 
5 Thays Deprati 
6 Madlaina Matter 
7 Méline Pierret 
8 Samira Sulser 
9 Sarina Wieland 
10 Sarah Van Rooij 
11 Maja Storck 
13 Oriane Hämmerli 
14 Laura Künzler 
16 Flavia Knutti 
19 Godeliv Schwarz 
20 Léa Zurlinden

Pool D

Finland

The following is the Finnish roster in the 2021 European Championship.

Head coach: Tapio Kangasniemi

2 Anna Czakan 
3 Katja Kylmäaho 
5 Suvi Kokkonen 
6 Krista Bjerregard-Madsen 
7 Emmi Riikilä 
8 Kaisa Alanko 
11 Salla Karhu 
12 Piia Korhonen 
13 Ronja Heikkiniemi  
15 Daniela Öhman 
16 Netta Laaksonen 
17 Laura Penttilä 
20 Rosa Bjärregård-Madsen 
21 Georgia Andrikopoulou

Netherlands

The following is the Dutch roster in the 2021 European Championship.

Head coach: Avital Selinger

1 Kirsten Knip 
4 Celeste Plak 
6 Maret Grothues 
7 Juliët Lohuis 
8 Demi Korevaar 
9 Myrthe Schoot 
11 Anne Buijs 
12 Britt Bongaerts 
14 Laura Dijkema 
16 Indy Baijens 
18 Marrit Jasper 
19 Nika Daalderop 
23 Eline Timmerman 
26 Elles Dambrink

Romania

The following is the Romanian roster in the 2021 European Championship.

Head coach: Luciano Pedullà

1 Diana Ariton 
3 Rodica Buterez 
4 Diana Balintoni 
7 Petruța Orlandea 
10 Denisa Ionescu 
11 Maria Matei 
12 Sorina Miclăuș 
13 Alexandra Ciucu 
14 Alexia Căruțașu 
15 Marina Cojocaru 
16 Andra Cojocaru 
19 Adelina Budai-Ungureanu 
20 Georgiana Popa 
23 Roxana Roman

Sweden

The following is the Swedish roster in the 2021 European Championship.

Head coach: Ettore Guidetti

1 Elsa Arrestad 
2 Sofia Andersson 
3 Linda Andersson 
7 Sofie Sjöberg 
8 Dalila-Lilly Topic 
9 Rebecka Lazić 
10 Isabelle Haak 
11 Alexandra Lazić 
14 Hanna Hellvig 
15 Diana Lundvall 
16 Vilma Andersson 
17 Anna Haak 
18 Julia Nilsson 
21 Gabriella Lundvall

Turkey

The following is the Turkish roster in the 2021 European Championship.

Head coach: Giovanni Guidetti

2 Simge Şebnem Aköz 
3 Cansu Özbay 
4 Tuğba Şenoğlu 
7 Hande Baladın 
8 Yasemin Güveli 
9 Meliha İsmailoğlu 
10 Ayça Aykaç 
12 Buse Ünal 
13 Meryem Boz 
14 Eda Erdem Dündar 
18 Zehra Güneş 
22 İlkin Aydın 
95 Beliz Başkır 
99 Ebrar Karakurt

Ukraine

The following is the Ukrainian roster in the 2021 European Championship.

Head coach: Vladimir Orlov

1 Kateryna Dudnyk 
2 Diana Meliushkyna 
5 Bohdana Anisova 
6 Krystyna Niemtseva 
7 Yuliya Gerasymova 
9 Yuliya Boyko 
11 Anna Kharchynska 
13 Anastasiya Karasova 
14 Daria Velykokon 
16 Nadiia Kodola 
17 Olga Skrypak 
18 Maryna Mazenko 
24 Olesia Rykhliuk 
33 Iryna Trushkina

See also
 2021 Men's European Volleyball Championship squads

References

External links 

E
Women's European Volleyball Championship